The following is a list of chapters Beta Theta Pi chapters. This list includes chapters that have gone Inactive since the fraternity was founded in 1839. Active chapters and colonies are indicated in bold. Inactive chapters and colonies are shown in italic.

Notes

References 

Lists of chapters of United States student societies by society
Beta Theta Pi